Claudia Chase served three terms in the New Hampshire House of Representatives.

In 2004, Chase, a Democrat from Francestown, was victorious in her first try for elective office. A recount determined that she won by four votes after the original tally had her Republican opponent winning by 31 votes.

References

Members of the New Hampshire House of Representatives
Women state legislators in New Hampshire
Living people
1978 births
21st-century American women